A Kiss for Cinderella is a 1925 American silent fantasy film taken from the 1916 stage play by James M. Barrie. The film stars Betty Bronson and Tom Moore and was made at Paramount's Astoria Studios in Astoria, Queens. The play had starred stage actress Maude Adams in the Bronson role.

The film was directed by Herbert Brenon who had also directed the 1924 film version of Barrie's Peter Pan, which also starred Bronson. Tom Moore had previously costarred in The Cinderella Man for Goldwyn in 1917 alongside Mae Marsh.

Plot
As described in a film magazine review, Jane, a house slavey who dreams of a Prince Charming, is named Cinderella by an artist whose studio she cleans because she always talks of wonderful things that will one day befall her. A policeman who at first suspects her of some mischief falls in love with her, and, after she recovers from an illness caused by exposure, he proposes and is accepted.

Cast

Preservation
Prints of A Kiss for Cinderella are preserved at the Museum of Modern Art, New York, George Eastman Museum Motion Picture Collection, UCLA Film and Television Archive, and the foreign archive Cinematheque Royale de Belgique (Brussels).

References

External links

Theatrical poster for A Kiss for Cinderella
Larger version of the lobby poster for A Kiss for Cinderella

1925 films
Paramount Pictures films
American silent feature films
1920s fantasy drama films
American black-and-white films
Films based on works by J. M. Barrie
Films set in London
Films set in the 1910s
Films directed by Herbert Brenon
American fantasy drama films
Films shot at Astoria Studios
Surviving American silent films
1925 drama films
American films based on plays
1920s American films
Silent American drama films
1920s English-language films